Lou Myers (1915 – November 20, 2005) was a cartoonist and short story writer.

He was the first person since James Thurber to contribute both cartoons and articles to The New Yorker.  His work has also appeared in The New York Times, The Nation, Esquire, Playboy, Penthouse, The Realist and Mother Jones.

External links
Info and samples
Cartoons from the New Yorker Store
"Lou Myers, Cartoonist With a Satiric Style, Dies at 90", New York Times, November 21, 2005
ZAKS Illustrators Source presents Lou Myers

1915 births
2005 deaths
The New Yorker cartoonists